The John F. Feehan Stakes is a Moonee Valley Racing Club Group 2 Australian Thoroughbred horse race held under Weight for Age conditions, for horses aged three years old and upwards, over a distance of 1600 meters at Moonee Valley Racecourse in September. The prize money is A$500,000.

History
The original race was named after John F. Feehan, who was the landowner of where the Moonee Valley Racecourse is located now. The race was named between 2005 and 2018 as the Dato' Tan Chin Nam Stakes after the Malaysian entrepreneur and racehorse owner Dato' Tan Chin Nam.

1950 Racebook

Name
 1948 – Glenroy Stakes
1949–1955 – J.F. Feehan Stakes
1956–1969 – J.F. Feehan Handicap
1970–1982 – J.F. Feehan Stakes
 1983 – Centennial Stakes
1984–2004 – J.F. Feehan Stakes
2005–2018 – Dato' Tan Chin Nam Stakes
2019 – J.F. Feehan Stakes

Distance
1948–1971 – 1 mile (~ 1600m)
1972–1986  – 1600 metres
 1987 – 1619 metres
 1988 onwards – 1600 metres

Grade
1948–1978 – Principal Race
1979 onwards – Group 2

Venue
 1995 – held at Caulfield Racecourse

Winners

 2022 – Mr Brightside 
 2021 – Superstorm 
 2020 – Humidor 
 2019 – Homesman 
 2018 – Magic Consol 
 2017 – Bonneval 
 2016 – Awesome Rock 
 2015 – The Cleaner
 2014 – The Cleaner
 2013 – Fiorente
 2012 – Happy Trails
 2011 – Rekindled Interest
 2010 – Whobegotyou
 2009 – Whobegotyou
 2008 – Guillotine
 2007 – El Segundo
 2006 – Lad of the Manor
 2005 – Lad of the Manor
 2004 – Delzao
 2003 – Natural Blitz
 2002 – Fields of Omagh
 2001 – Northerly
 2000 – Sunline
 1999 – Inaflury
 1998 – Aerosmith
 1997 – Arctic Scent
 1996 – Toil
 1995 – Beaux Art
 1994 – Tristalove
 1993 – Palace Reign
 1992 – Naturalism
 1991 – Mannerism
 1990 – Better Loosen Up
 1989 – Our Westminster
 1988 – Our Poetic Prince
 1987 – Rubiton
 1986 – Dazzling Duke
 1985 – King Delamere
 1984 – Penny Edition
 1983 – Strawberry Road
 1982 – Lawman
 1981 – Lawman
 1980 – Arbogast
 1979 – Gondolier
 1978 – So Called
 1977 – Vice Regal
 1976 – Wave King
 1975 – Tontonan
 1974 – Arama
 1973 – Audaciter
 1972 – Grand Scale
 1971 – Upstairs
 1970 – Shorengro
 1969 – Shorengro
 1968 – Shorengro
 1967 – Bellition
 1966 – †race not held
 1965 – Winfreux
 1964 – Heroic Stone
 1963 – Sometime
 1962 – Royal Belltor
 1961 – Mardene
 1960 – †race not held
 1959 – Malarno
 1958 – Summalu
 1957 – On Parade
 1956 – Arlunya
 1955 – Townsville
 1954 – Rising Fast
 1953 – Quite Talk
 1952 – Zezette
 1951 – Iron Duke
 1950 – Chicquita
 1949 – Ellerslie
 1948 – Phoibos

† 1960 & 1966 Race meeting cancelled because of rain

See also
 List of Australian Group races
 Group races

References

Horse races in Australia
Open mile category horse races
1948 establishments in Australia
Recurring sporting events established in 1948